The Royal Belgian Badminton Federation (RBBF) is the governing body for Badminton in Belgium. The administrative seat is located in Sprimont. The federation was one of the eleven founding members of Badminton Europe in 1967. It oversees both regional organizations in the country: the Badminton Vlaanderen and Ligue Francophone Belge de Badminton.

Tournaments
Belgian International, annual open tournament held since 1958
 Belgian Junior
Belgian National Badminton League
Belgian National Badminton Championships

Ranking of players
Competition badminton players in Belgium are ranked individually in each discipline according to a letter system. This system is organized as follows (starting with lowest): D, C2, C1, B2, B1 and A.

References

Badminton in Belgium
National members of the Badminton World Federation
Badminton
1949 establishments in Belgium